Repent is the live album by The Dead C, released in 1996 through Siltbreeze.

Track listing

Personnel 
The Dead C – production
Michael Morley – instruments
Bruce Russell – instruments
Robbie Yeats – instruments

References 

1996 live albums
The Dead C albums